Pandemis monticolana is a species of moth of the family Tortricidae. It is found in China (Heilongjiang, Jilin), South Korea and Japan.

The wingspan is 19–25 mm.

References

	

Moths described in 1975
Pandemis